The yellow-throated tinkerbird (Pogoniulus subsulphureus) is a species of bird in the Lybiidae family (African barbets).

Range
It is found throughout the intra-tropical rainforest of Sub-Saharan Africa.

References

External links

Image at ADW
Yellow-throated tinkerbird (Pogoniulus subsulphureus) at The Internet Bird Collection

yellow-throated tinkerbird
Birds of the Gulf of Guinea
Birds of Central Africa
Birds of West Africa
yellow-throated tinkerbird
yellow-throated tinkerbird
Taxonomy articles created by Polbot